The Directors Guild of America Award for Outstanding Directorial Achievement in Movies for Television and Limited Series is one of the annual Directors Guild of America Awards given by the Directors Guild of America. It was first awarded at the 24th Directors Guild of America Awards in 1972. The award was previously named the Directors Guild of America Award for Outstanding Directorial Achievement in Miniseries or Movies for Television.

Winners and nominees

1970s

1980s

1990s

2000s

2010s

2020s

Multiple wins and nominations

References

External links
  (official website)

Directors Guild of America Awards